Kavukattu Mar Mathew Metropolitan (17 July 1904 – 9 October 1969) was the first Syro-Malabar Catholic Archbishop of the Archdiocese of Changanassery. He was appointed bishop in 1950, elevated as archbishop in 1956 and served as Metropolitan until his death. He was named a Servant of God in 1994.

References

External links
 Mathew Kavukattu bio sketch
 Archbishop Matthew Kavukattu †

Eastern Catholic Servants of God
1904 births
1969 deaths
20th-century Eastern Catholic bishops
Syro-Malabar bishops
Archbishops of Changanassery
20th-century venerated Christians
Participants in the Second Vatican Council
Malayali people
People from Pala, Kerala